Manglawar (also spelled Manglor) is an administrative unit, known as Union council or Ward of Tehsil Babuzai, of Swat District in the Khyber Pakhtunkhwa province of Pakistan.
It is located at 34°48'30.7"N 72°25'50.0"E with an average altitude of 987 meters (3,238.19 feet).

Administrative division 

Manglawar is divided into sub-parts for better administrative hold. Manglawar is divided on the basis of two systems:
 1967-based:
This division is based upon West Pakistan Land Revenue Act, 1967 (W.P. Act No. XVII of 1967).
According to this division Manglawar is Union Council which also includes Union Council Aka Maruf Khel i-e: (Bishbanr, Kass, Banjot & Sar Sardaray) Goratai, Taligram etc. This system is still used in most of Patwar and Land revenue systems.

 KPK Local Government-based:
This division is based upon the Khyber Pakhtunkhwa Local Government System and Act 2013 which was recommended on 31 October 2013, and was practically applied in Local Bodies Election May 2015 by Government of Khyber Pakhtunkhwa by Pakistan Tehreek-e-Insaf officials, as they are ruling at the time. According to Khyber Pakhtunkhwa Local Government Act 2013. District Swat has 67 wards, of which total amount of village councils is 170, and neighborhood councils is 44.

According to this system Manglawar is a ward which is further divided into two village councils:
 Manglawar East
 Manglawar West

Manglawar East
Manglawar East, also known as Manglawar No.1 or Aka Maruf, is a Village Council. It is situated on East side of Manglawar. Manglawar East is inhabited by Akamaroof Pashtuns which is a sub tribe or clan of Babuzai. Manglawar East, Akamaroof consist of Haqdad Khel, Mazid Khel, Malakanan, Miangan, Mulan and other racial groups.
Manglawar East consists of small Mohallas (Mohallas; A bunch of Houses in one place):

 Shingrai
 Salanda
 Said Abad
 Azimabad
 Murad Abad
 Gul Mayera
 Azgharai
 Enzartangai
 Dewangai
 Batra
 Shakhorai
 Tekai
 Mohalla Haqdad Khel
 Kuz Mazid Khel
 Mazid Khel Bala
 Mohalla BakhtMand Khan
 Gudyan
 Mohalla Madi Khel
 Mohalla Saidan

Manglawar comes in Manglawar Ward No.39 East-1. The following are details on electoral point of view (LG Election 2015):
 Amount of register voters is 9175.
 Of which male is 5055 and female is 4125.
 Charge No: 308
 Circle No: 07
 Block No: 01, 04, 05, 06 & 08
 Block Code: 003080701, 003080704, 003080705, 003080706, 003080708
 The amount of allotted seats for General Councilor is: 9.

Manglawar West
Manglawar West also known as Manglawar No.2 or Bami Khel is a Village Council. It is situated on West side of Manglawar.
Manglawar West is inhabited by Bami Khel Pashtuns which is a sub tribe of Babuzai. Manglawar West also known as Bami Khel consisted of Musa Khel, Burhan Khel, Mir Khel, Usman Khel, Langar Khel, Bibal Khel, Fateh Khan Khel, Dawlat Khel, Esa Khel, Miangan, Mulan and other peoples.

Manglawar West consists of small mohallas (a bunch of houses in one place):

 Ali Khan Khel
 Fateh Khan Khel
 Bibal Khel 
 Rahat Abad (Gharib Abad)
 Kara
 Kalkata
 Zanagram
 Miangan
 Mohalla Esa Khel
 Garai Kalay
 Manglawar Pul
 Malak Nagar
 Dawlat Khel
 Tawheed Abad
 Shaheed Abad
 Gulshan Colony Maira
 Cheel
 Mohalla Bakht Pur Khan
 Bhatai
 Shakaray
 Shaldara

Local Bodies Election 2015

Local Bodies Elections were held on May 29, 2015.
Manglawar East and West have their own chairman and vice chairman.

Manglawar is a whole Ward having its own local Ggvernment, consisting of District Councilor and Tehsil Councilor.
According to Election Commission of Pakistan the following are the Cabinet for five years:

Before this Nazim (chairman) and Naib Nazim (Vice Chairman) in 2002 were Malak Bakhtmand Khan (Late) and Haji Bakhtiar Khan (Late).

Population 
In 1998 population of Manglawar was 164000.
Total population of Manglawar is estimated to be around 45 thousands.

Education

Educational institutes

Government sector 
Total number of government boys' schools in Manglawar are: 47  Details of which are given below:

Sports 
Residents of Manglawar take a keen interest in sports. Local games include Parpatonay, Amprakakay, Tekaan (Belwori), Gwatai, Shengrii (Qoramban), Qat, Ludo, Ghal bacha, Peetogaram, Da Simano Elay, Chendakh, Parai, and Neenzaki. They also play football, cricket and badminton.

Manglawar Ground 
Manglawar has its own ground on the West side of Manglawar near Sangota and Excelsior College Swat, opposite to Pakistan State Oil Fuel Station, and beside Miangul Abdul Haq Jahanzeb Kidney Hospital. In the playground, the youth of Manglawar plays after dawn time. The approximate Length of Manglawar Playground is 195 meters and width is 70 meters (9 Kanal, 17 Marley). There are football posts and goalposts. You can also play Cricket.

Football teams 
Manglawar currently has a number of football teams, which take part in Village-based and Inter District. They are:
 Manglawar Eleven Football Club
 Prince Eleven Football club
 Eleven star Manglawar
 Al sayed Salanda

Manglawar had very famous teams in past like Tofan Eleven and Brazil Eleven. Manglawar have some legends of footballers named Rahmat Ali ChaCha, Rahim Ali, Duraj Khan and Rokhan.

Manglawar also had junior teams, including 
United Manglawar
Young Man Manglor
Eagle star fc
Young 11 Manglor
Shaghai fc  Manglawar
Intezar fc

Cricket teams 
Cricket teams are as follows:
 Manglawar Eleven Cricket Club
 Manglawar Titans
 Skylark Manglawar
 Hunter Cricket Club Manglawar
 Manglawar Gladiator cricket club
Manglawar lions

Online gaming 
The people of Manglawar are into online games as well, PUBG, Free Fire and 8 ball pool etc. . Mehrban is one the most skilled and a popular PUBG player.

Addresses

Post office 
Manglawar Swat has BO (Branch Office) which works under GPO Saidu Sharif.

Postal Code 
Postal Code of Manglawar is 19201. While postal code of Saidu Sharif GPO is 19200.

ZIP Code 
ZIP code of Swat (Station: Saidu Sharif) is 19200. So Manglawar also has ZIP code 19200.

Fame 
Manglawar is famous for many things. Some of them are:
 Manglawar is famous for, as it is having the second biggest rock carved Buddha Statue (formally called as Budh Ghat) at Jahan Abad (Janabad) in Central Asia after Buddha of Bamiyan.
 Dwa Saro, the second highest mountain in Swat of approximately 10,000 feet from Sea level.
 Malka Swat, the queen of Malak Ahmad Baba (Founder of Yusufzai in Swat) was from here, also now she is buried in Dherai Manglawar.
 Sultan Awais (Sultan’was) the last emperor of Swati Yousafzai state was from Manglawar, the remains of the castle are still observable. 
 It is said that Mubaraka Yusufzai, the wife of Babur, was from Manglawar.
 Manglawar, the ancient capital of Swat (Udyana or Swastu).
 Tourist attraction to Waterfall in Shingrai.
 Fishes, Manglawar has a river where best variety of fishes having a mouth-watering taste, hunters came from far flung areas  to quench their desire with the piquant taste. 
 Furniture and woodworking handicrafts work is also famous made for the locally produced wood from the jungles of Manglawar.
 Cement rocks which is in Shingrai. 
 Manglawar is site for the best Rabab players, and loke singer of Pashto music.
 For Education, as compared to Swat, Manglawar has more than educated people from other places.
 Cobbler's make shoes, which are famous for their beauty.
 Pul Shopar (Gungri also known as a cocktail) is a food, people from far areas used to enjoy it mostly on Friday. etc.

Hospitals

Miangul Abdul Haq Jahanzeb Kidney Hospital 
Miangul Abdul Haq Jahanzeb Kidney Hospital [MJKH] is situated in Garai Kalay Manglawar Swat. It is a 110-bed hospital and was a Project of Punjab Hospitals Trust. According to officials, the hospital has 40-bed urology and 40-bed nephrology units that provide all sorts of services including free surgeries at three state-of-the-art operation theatres for renal diseases. They added that on average, 90 dialysis treatments were conducted at the facility which had also ICU and HDU to cope with seriously ill patients.

Economy

Crops & Fruits 
The village climate is favorable for many crops and fruits. The village not only fulfills their own need but also supplies its product to other areas. Among these are Apricots, Palms, & Peach, Maize, Wheat, Rice, Vegetables are more common.

Insurgency 
During the insurgency period of Swat, the People of Manglawar suffered from the Terrorism of extremists. But compared to other parts of Swat, Manglawar suffered less. Because of the less involvement of people in such instances. When the Pakistani military agreed on doing an operation against terrorism, the people of Manglawar migrated from their homes to Peshawar, Mardan, Swabi, Nowshera, etc. First, they migrated on 25 October 2007 during the Operation Rah-e-Haq, and then on 16 May 2009 during operation Operation Rah-e-Rast
During these black days one of high-profile Miangul Asfandyar Amir Zeb was assassinated in Kass Manglawar on 28 December 2007 with six of his supporters including Malak Bakhtmand khan and Zahir Shah Khan.

Miscellaneous

Babagan 
Baz Dada (in Manglawar bazar), Mian Shah Rasool baba (in Manglawar ada), Mian Shekh baba (in Shakhorai) are spiritual people which are buried in Manglawar. There are many folk tales attached to them in local people. In Manglawar a brave women fighter is also graved named as Shaheeda Abai.

Bank 
National Bank of Pakistan (Branch Code 231639 or 1639) is situated near Manglawar Pul.

Time zone 
Time zone of Manglawar is Pakistan Standard Time: PST (UTC+5).

e-Sahulat 
e-Sahulat (Branch Code: 61317) is situated in a Mall which is situated near Manglawar Pul / Bridge.

Shingrai Waterfall 

Shingrai Waterfall (often called: ShingroDand) is situated in Shingrai Manglawar, which is situated in Swat Valley, Khyber Pakhtunkhwa the province of Pakistan.

See also 

 Buddhist Rock Carvings in Manglawar
 Muhammad Parvesh Shaheen
 Miangul Abdul Haq Jahanzeb Kidney Hospital
 Tehsil Babuzai
 Swat District

References

External links
 Manglawar Swat Blog
 Video documentary of ZamaSwat Team on Manglawar
 GeoView.Info 1 - 2
 Wikimedia Category: Manglawar village
 Khyber-Pakhtunkhwa Government website section on Lower Dir
 United Nations
 Hajjinfo.org Uploads
 PBS paiman.jsi.com
 Khyber-Pakhtunkhwa Government website section on Lower Dir

Manglawar
Swat District
Populated places in Swat District
Union councils of Khyber Pakhtunkhwa
Union Councils of Swat District